Jerran Hart (born 19 January 1991) is a former motorcycle speedway rider from England.

Speedway career
He rode in the top tier of British Speedway, riding for the Ipswich Witches during the 2009 Elite League speedway season. He began his British career riding for Newport Wasps in 2008.

His last season was riding for the Scunthorpe Scorpions in 2012.

References 

1991 births
Living people
British speedway riders
Ipswich Witches riders
Lakeside Hammers riders